Lina Kuduzović (born 30 December 2002) is a Slovenian singer who won the first season of Slovenia's Got Talent in 2010 when she was 7 years old, making her the youngest winner of any Got Talent show to that time. In 2015 Kuduzović represented Slovenia at the Junior Eurovision Song Contest, with her song "Prva ljubezen" ("First love"). She ended 3rd with 112 points.  In 2017 she auditioned for The Voice Kids Germany, making it to the finals. Currently she lives in Switzerland with her family.
Her first single, "Ephemeral," was released in 2018. She participated in EMA 2020 with the song, "Man Like U", where she finished second.

Discography 
Lina (2012)

References

External links 
 Official website

2002 births
Living people
Musicians from Ljubljana
Junior Eurovision Song Contest entrants
The Voice of Germany
Slovenian child singers
Slovenian people of Bosnia and Herzegovina descent
Slovenian expatriates in Switzerland